Hendrik Smits (9 December 1907 – 12 September 1976) was a Dutch rower. He competed in the men's coxed pair event at the 1928 Summer Olympics.

References

1907 births
1976 deaths
Dutch male rowers
Olympic rowers of the Netherlands
Rowers at the 1928 Summer Olympics